Carolyn Steinberg (born 1956) is an American flutist and composer.

Biography 
Steinberg graduated from North Texas State University with a Bachelor of Music degree in music theory in 1978. She went on to study composition with Ludmila Ulehla at the Manhattan School of Music where she received a master's degree, and with and Bernard Rands at Juilliard where she received a Doctor of Musical Arts in 1989. She also studied in Europe with Franco Donatoni in Siena, Italy, and Brian Ferneyhough and Francis Travis in Germany.

During her studies, Steinberg began working as a music teacher. She taught at Freiburg Conservatory of Music from 1984–86, at Mannes School of Music from 1992–96, and at The Juilliard School, Pre-College Division, from 1993-2001. Steinberg received the Goddard Lieberson Award of the American Academy and Institute of Arts and Letters in 1990.

Works
Selected compositions include:
 
 La Ventana
 El nectar de Apam
 Fire in Los Alamos
 Ninananna
 Danzon Macabre
 In the Early Dawn
 Alchemy
 The Moon Dances Tonight
 The Jester and the Necklace
 What We Use
 Are You Shaky?
 Allemande
 Courante
 Sarabande
 Siciliano e Cubano
 Do Not Stand at My Grave and Weep

Her works have been recorded and issued on CD, including:

Songs, Dances, Duos chamber music (2007)

References

1956 births
Living people
20th-century classical composers
American music educators
American women music educators
American women classical composers
American classical composers
University of North Texas College of Music alumni
Manhattan School of Music alumni
Juilliard School alumni
20th-century American women musicians
20th-century American composers
20th-century women composers
21st-century American women